Jeff Forrest is an American recording engineer.

Bio and Career
Jeff Forrest was born in Flint Michigan and attended Central Michigan University and The Berklee College of Music.
Jeff Forrest is a recording engineer from the San Diego area who is most known for engineering Blink-182's first album Cheshire Cat (Blink-182 album). He is also credited for co-writing Blink-182's song "Wasting Time". Jeff Forrest owns Doubletime Recording Studio in San Diego, CA and has worked on records for regional bands such as Rocket From the Crypt, Fluf, Jejune, Jack's Broken Heart, No Gimmick and Kill Holiday. Forrest's most recent work is with the band 'Pink Yacht Club'.

Forrest moved from Atlanta to Los Angeles in the late 1980s looking to catch on with the music industry.
Forrest spent years recording under the moniker 'Forrest Butler' producing music for artists at his previous studio (East County Studio). Forrest eventually became a producer and started his own label 'Immune Label'.Immune Records released Mike Keneally's hat, Boil that Dust Speck, Half Alive in Hollywood and The Mistakes.

Discography
1992 hat-Mike Keneally

1992 Na Vucca Do Lupu-Three Mile Pilot

1992 Slake-Drip Tank

1993 Curves that Kick-16

1994 Cheshire Cat-Blink 182

1994 Shrunken Head-Deadbolt

1994 Songs in the Key of Bree-Buck-O-Nine

1995 Barfly-Buck-O-Nine

1995 Boil that Dust Speck-Mike Keneally 

1995 The Classic Years- Fluf

1995 The Romantic Adventures of Harry- Gregory Page

1996 Chiaroscuro- Turkey Mallet

1996 Drop Out- 16

1995 The Mistakes

1995 Kiss Me Twice I'm Schitzo- The Sort of Quartet

1995 Orien's Sky-Peggy Watson

1996 Half Alive in Hollywood-Mike Keneally

1997 Sluggo-Mike Keneally

External links
 Doubletime Recording Studio

References

Living people
American audio engineers
People from San Diego
Engineers from California
Year of birth missing (living people)